Eder Silva Ferreira (born April 7, 1983) is a Brazilian football player.

References

External links

1983 births
Living people
Brazilian footballers
J2 League players
Shonan Bellmare players
Association football midfielders